is a Japanese video game artist best known for his work with Team Silent.

Career
Ito worked as background and creature designer on the survival horror video game Silent Hill in 1999. He was art director for its sequel, Silent Hill 2 (2001), working on both the original game and its reissue Restless Dreams, as well as being the chief monster designer/modeler. Ito was the art director again in Silent Hill 3 (2003), as well as "drama camera designer".

The team disbanded with the release of the fourth game, Silent Hill 4: The Room in 2004 and for which Ito received a "Special Thanks" credit in the game. Ito and fellow Team Silent scriptwriter Hiroyuki Owaku went on to work together on Silent Hill: Cage of Cradle (2006), a digital manga published by Konami, downloadable for cell-phones and only available in Japan.

He maintains a personal website, complete with an online gallery of his Silent Hill–oriented artwork. Ito designed the cover art for the Japanese release of Silent Hill: Downpour (2012).

In 2012, Masahiro Ito stated on his Twitter that he would be willing to work on another Silent Hill game with Hideo Kojima. In 2014 he worked with Hifumi Kono and Takashi Shimizu on the video game NightCry featuring Kiyoishi Arai (Final Fantasy) for visuals, design and in image board team.

Works

References

External links 
Masahiro Ito on Twitter
 

Year of birth missing (living people)
Japanese video game designers
Konami people
Living people
Silent Hill
Video game artists